James McDonald (born 6 January 1992) is a New Zealand thoroughbred racing jockey and member of the New Zealand Racing Hall of Fame. On 2 November 2021, McDonald rode the winning horse Verry Elleegant in the 2021 Melbourne Cup. He is the World Jockey of the Year for 2021 in the TRC Global Rankings.

Group 1 winners (77)
McDonald has currently ridden 77 Group One winners:

AJC Derby (1) - It's A Dundeel (2013)
All Aged Stakes  (1) - Cascadian (2022)
Auckland Cup (1) - Shez Sinsational (2012)
Australian Oaks (2) - Rising Romance (2014); Verry Elleegant (2019)
Canterbury Stakes (2) - Cosmic Endeavour (2015); Holler (2016)
Caulfield Guineas (3) - Shooting To Win (2014); The Autumn Sun (2018); Golden Mile (2022)
Caulfield Stakes (1) - Anamoe (2022)
Champagne Stakes (1) - Captivant (2021)
Champions Mile (1) - Xtension (2012)
Chipping Norton Stakes (4) - Contributer (2015); Verry Elleegant (2021); Verry Elleegant (2022); Anamoe (2023)
Coolmore Stud Stakes (2) - Home Affairs (2021); In Secret (2022)
Cox Plate (1) - Anamoe (2022)
Darley Sprint Classic (3) - Delectation (2015); Nature Strip (2019); Nature Strip (2021)
Doomben Cup (1) - Zaaki (2021)
Empire Rose Stakes (1) - Shillelagh (2018)
Epsom Handicap (1) - Hauraki (2016)
Flight Stakes (2) - Funstar (2019); Zougotcha (2022)
George Main Stakes (2) - Verry Elleegant (2021); Anamoe (2022)
George Ryder Stakes (2) - Real Impact (2015); Anamoe (2023)
Golden Rose Stakes (2) - Exosphere (2015); Astern (2016)
Golden Slipper Stakes (1) - Mossfun (2014)
Hong Kong Cup (1) - Romantic Warrior (2022)
King's Stand Stakes (1) - Nature Strip (2022)
Lightning Stakes (1) - Home Affairs (2022)
Mackinnon Stakes (1) - Zaaki (2021)
Haunui Farm WFA Classic (1) - Keep The Peace (2011)
Melbourne Cup (1) - Verry Elleegant (2021)
Moir Stakes (1) - Nature Strip (2019)
Mudgway Stakes (1) - Keep The Peace (2010)
New Zealand Derby (1) - Silent Achiever (2012)
New Zealand International Stakes (1) - Shez Sinsational (2012)
New Zealand Oaks (1) - Jungle Rocket (2009)
New Zealand Stakes (1) - Scarlett Lady (2012) 
New Zealand Thoroughbred Breeders Stakes (1) - Special Mission (2008)
Queen Elizabeth Stakes (1) - It's A Dundeel (2014)
Queensland Derby (1) - Kukeracha (2021)
Queensland Oaks (1) - Scarlett Lady (2011)
Queen's Silver Jubilee Cup (1) - Lucky Sweynesse (2023)
Randwick Guineas (1) - It's A Dundeel (2013)
Ranvet Stakes (2) - Contributer (2015); Verry Elleegant (2021)
Rosehill Guineas (2) - It's A Dundeel (2013); Anamoe (2022)
Sires' Produce Stakes (1) - Anamoe (2021)
Spring Champion Stakes (1) - It's A Dundeel (2012)
Tancred Stakes (3) - Hartnell (2015); Avilius (2019); Verry Elleegant (2020)
Telegraph Handicap (1) - Guiseppina (2012)
The Galaxy (2) - Temple Of Boom (2012); Nature Strip (2019)
The Metropolitan (1) - Magic Hurricane (2015)
The Thousand Guineas (1) - Madame Pommery (2022)
TJ Smith Stakes (3) - Nature Strip (2020); Nature Strip (2021); Nature Strip (2022)
Turnbull Stakes (1) - Hartnell (2016)
Underwood Stakes (1) - It's A Dundeel (2014)
Vinery Stud Stakes (1) - Verry Elleegant (2019)
Winx Stakes (2) - Verry Elleegant (2020); Anamoe (2022)
Zabeel Classic (2) - Shez Sinsational (2011); True Enough (2019)

References 

1992 births
Living people
New Zealand Racing Hall of Fame inductees
New Zealand jockeys
Australian jockeys